James William Durbin (born January 6, 1989) is an American singer and guitarist from Santa Cruz, California, who finished in fourth place on the tenth season of American Idol in 2011. Durbin was the lead singer for heavy metal band Quiet Riot from 2017 to 2019.

Early life
Durbin was born in 1989 to Judy Settle-Durbin, a dentist's daughter, and Willy Durbin, a bass player, who died of a heroin overdose when James was nine. He stated during his aired audition on American Idol that he was upset he didn't have the chance to know his father well. He was diagnosed with Tourette syndrome and Asperger syndrome shortly after his father died. He attended Musicschool, a music school run by Dale Ockerman in Santa Cruz instead of a traditional school.  Durbin never graduated from high school. Durbin cites popular bands My Chemical Romance and Thirty Seconds to Mars as his inspirations for his music.

In 2006, he performed in a Santa Cruz children's theater group called Kids on Broadway and played the lead role in Grease and Beauty and the Beast. In 2007, he played the leading roles of Tony in West Side Story and Oscar in Sweet Charity—both productions produced by All About Theatre, a Santa Cruz community theatre company. In 2008, Durbin appeared in Alan Parsons' "Art & Science of Sound Recording" educational video series, recording a version of Parsons' "We Play The Game" at Ex'pression College for Digital Arts.

He was the lead singer in a band called Hollywood Scars, where he went by the stage name of Jimmy Levox. Influenced by bands such as Metallica, Pantera, Judas Priest, Dream Theater, Guns N' Roses, Iron Maiden and Mötley Crüe, Hollywood Scars drew their inspiration from the glitz, glam, and decadence of Hollywood's Sunset Strip in the 1980s. The band released a single entitled "Under The Cherry Tree". He was also in a band called Whatever Fits. He has also sung country music.

Career

American Idol
Durbin had previously auditioned for American Idol in the eighth season, but was not chosen.

Durbin was eliminated in the Top 4 on the tenth season, but despite his elimination, he received a homecoming previously reserved for Top 3 contestants, the first time such an exception on the homecoming policy was made by the show.  Footage of his homecoming, dubbed the "Durbin Day", was shown briefly on the Top 3 performance show.

He appeared on the American Idol tenth-season finale, singing "Livin' After Midnight" and "Breaking the Law" with Judas Priest.

Performances and results

 Due to the judges using their one save to save Casey Abrams, the Top 11 remained intact for another week, when two contestants were eliminated.

Post-Idol
After his elimination Durbin appeared on The Tonight Show with Jay Leno,
Live with Regis and Kelly, Late Night with Jimmy Fallon, and The Ellen DeGeneres Show.  Along with the rest of the Top 11 finalists, he participated in the American Idol Tour that season.

He appeared in a documentary, Different Is The New Normal, that focused on a teen's effort to overcome Tourette syndrome.

Durbin is being managed by 19 Entertainment, alongside fellow contestants Pia Toscano and Haley Reinhart. It was announced that he was signed to Wind-up Records on September 5, 2011.

On May 28, 2011, Durbin and the other American Idol top 4 performed at the opening of the new Microsoft Store at Lenox Square Mall in Atlanta, Georgia.

Durbin, along with fellow contestants Scotty McCreery, Lauren Alaina, and Haley Reinhart, released a Walmart Exclusive EP with his highlights from American Idol. The tracks feature "Will You Still Love Me Tomorrow", "Uprising" and a previously unreleased recording of "Good Riddance (Time of Your Life)".

Memories of a Beautiful Disaster (2011–2012)

Durbin started working on his debut album after appearing on American Idol, and wrote with James Michael and Marti Frederiksen, as well as his favorite band Hardcore Superstar. The album was produced by Howard Benson.  He recorded a track entitled "Stand Up" for the album Official Gameday Music of the NFL, Volume 2 which was released for sale on September 27, 2011.  The song was also included in his album.

On November 21, 2011, Durbin released the album, titled Memories of a Beautiful Disaster.  The album debuted at number 36 on the Billboard 200, at number eight on the Billboard Rock Chart, number 25 on the Digital Album Chart, and sold 28,000 the first week.  Two singles were released to radio simultaneously—"Love Me Bad" was released to Top 40 radio stations, while "Stand Up" was released to rock radio.

Durbin released a Christmas single, "Santa Claus Is Back in Town" on November 27, 2012.

Durbin performed "Love Me Bad" on Conan and "Higher Than Heaven" on American Idol in support of his album.

Celebrate (2013–2014)
Durbin's second album, Celebrate, was released April 8, 2014. It was produced by Scott "The Ninja" Stevens and Durbin co wrote songs with Scott Stevens, Ted Bruner, Griffin Boyce and Stevie Aiello. The first single, "Parachute," was released on November 22, 2013.

Durbin performed "Parachute" on Conan in support of his album.

Riot on Sunset (2015–2016)
In 2015, Durbin raised funds for his third album via PledgeMusic. In November 2015, Durbin released a Christmas EP, A Thrill of Hope. He released the video for his first single "Smackdown" in April 2016.

On April 7, 2016, Durbin returned to Idol for the final episode of the fifteenth season.

On Durbin's 28th birthday, he released a stop motion animated music video he made with his son Hunter.

In 2016 Durbin and Alex Grossi of Quiet Riot worked on an album project "Maps to the Hollywood Scars". Volume 1 was released as a 5-song EP in February 2017.

Quiet Riot (2017–2019)

In March 2017, Durbin joined Quiet Riot, as their new lead singer. The band reported that their upcoming album, Road Rage would be re-recorded prior to its release to feature Durbin on lead vocals. After recording a follow-up album, Durbin quit the band in September 2019. The album, Hollywood Cowboys, was released on November 8, 2019.

The Beast Awakens (2020–present)
In October 2020, Durbin revealed he had signed with Frontiers Records and was working on a "pure heavy metal" album. The Beast Awakens was released on February 12, 2021, under the Durbin moniker. Alongside Durbin, who performs lead vocals and rhythm guitar, the album also features drummer Mike Vanderhule and bassist Barry Sparks.

From The New World (2022) 
Durbin appeared on Alan Parsons' 2022 CD, From The New World, singing "Give 'Em My Love".

Personal life
Durbin is married to Heidi Air Lowe. They have a son named Hunter, and a daughter named Kinzee Cruz. The couple were married on December 31, 2011. Durbin is an avid fan of professional wrestling.

Discography

Solo career 
 Studio albums

 Extended plays

 Singles

with Quiet Riot
 Studio albums
 Road Rage (2018)
 Hollywood Cowboys (2019)

 Live album
 One Night in Milan (2019)

with Durbin
 Studio albums 
 The Beast Awakens (2021)

References

External links
DurbinRock Official website    –  Archived from the original Sept 27, 2020
James Durbin says goodbye on American Idol   –   Archived from the original June 5, 2012   (includes some messages left by fans)

1989 births
21st-century American male singers
21st-century American singers
American Idol participants
Living people
Musicians from Santa Cruz, California
People with Asperger syndrome
People with Tourette syndrome
Singers from California
21st-century American guitarists
Guitarists from California
American male guitarists
Quiet Riot members